Pitzen is a surname. Notable people with the surname include:

 Marianne Pitzen (born 1948), German artist
 Timmothy Pitzen (born 2004), six-year-old boy who disappeared in 2011

See also
 Pitzer

English-language surnames